Safe schools may refer to:

 Safe Schools Declaration, international
 Safe Schools Act, Ontario, Canada
 Safe Schools/Healthy Students, United States
 Safe Schools Coalition Australia